The London Concert may refer to:

 The London Concert (Oscar Peterson album), 1978
 The London Concert (George Russell album), 1990